Sylvia of the Secret Service is a 1917 American silent thriller film directed by George Fitzmaurice and starring Irene Castle, J.H. Gilmour and Elliott Dexter. Erich von Stroheim worked as assistant director and technical advisor as well as playing the role of the villain. It was given a second release in 1922.

The film's sets were designed by the art director Anton Grot. It was shot at studios in Fort Lee in New Jersey.

Synopsis
During World War I, An American secret agent attempt to prevent a German sabotage ring from blowing up ammunition dumps in New York.

Cast
 Irene Castle as Sylvia 
 J.H. Gilmour as Van Brunn 
 Elliott Dexter as Curtis Prescott 
 Suzanne Willa as Fay Walling 
 J.W. Percival as Hemming 
 Erich von Stroheim as The villain

References

Bibliography
 Koszarski, Richard . Fort Lee: The Film Town (1904-2004). Indiana University Press, 2005.
 Lennig, Arthur. Stroheim. University Press of Kentucky, 2004.

External links

1917 films
1910s thriller films
American thriller films
Films directed by George Fitzmaurice
American silent feature films
1910s English-language films
Pathé Exchange films
American black-and-white films
Silent thriller films
1910s American films